The Katra Masjid is a former caravanserai, mosque and the tomb of Nawab Murshid Quli Khan. It was built between 1723 and 1724. It is one of the largest caravanserais in the Indian subcontinent. It was built during the 18th century, when the early modern Bengal Subah was a major hub of trade in Eurasia. The Katra Masjid is located in the north eastern side of the city of Murshidabad, in the Indian state of West Bengal. The most striking feature of the structure are the two large corner towers having loopholes for musketry.

The site is maintained and protected by the Archaeological Survey of India and the Government of West Bengal.

According to the List of Monuments of National Importance in West Bengal, the Tomb and Mosque of Murshid Quli Khan (also Katra Masjid) are ASI Listed Monuments.

Etymology
Close to the mosque there was a bazaar (market). The word katra means caravanserai while masjid means mosque.

Geography

Location

Hazarduari Palace and its associated sites in the Kila Nizamat area (forming the central area in the map alongside) is the centre of attraction in Murshidabad. Just a little away are Katra Masjid, Fauti Mosque, Jama Masjid and the Motijhil area. There is a group of attractions in the northern part of the town (as can be seen in the map alongside). Some attractions such as Khushbagh, Rosnaiganj, Baranagar, Kiriteswari Temple, Karnasuvarna and others are on the other side of the river and there are attractions in the neighbouring Berhampore area also (not shown in the map).

Note: The map alongside presents some of the notable locations in Murshidabad city. Most of the places marked in the map are linked in the larger full screen map. A few, without pages yet, remain unmarked. The map has a scale. It will help viewers to find out the distances.

Construction
Murshid Quli Khan on reaching old age, expressed his desire to construct his tomb adjacent to a mosque. He entrusted the responsibility for constructing the mosque to his trusted follower who was an architect, Murad Farash Khan .

Features

The mosque stands on a square plinth. It is a brick built mosque and is surrounded by double storied domed cells, which were built for those who read the Quran in those days, they can also be called a Madrasa. All the rooms can in all accommodate 700 Quran readers. These rooms from a cloister to the huge courtyard in front of these rooms. Four big minars stand at the four corners. These are octagonal in plan and taper upwards. The two towers or the minarets in front of the mosque are 70 feet high and 25 feet in diameter. The whole mosque is quadrangular in shape, the whole mosque has no pillar support but it has been given support by a raised platform below the mosque or by several arches. The mosque has however been destroyed in the 1897 earthquake. Each minar has a winding staircase which leads to the top, one can see a major part of the city of Murshidabad from there. At the two ends of the mosque, two miratets measuring 70 feet high, are still existing to date in a dilapidated condition, they had domes which were destroyed in the 1897 earthquake. In 1780 AD, a traveller name William Hodges wrote that 700 Quran readers lived there in the mosque. Hodges in his book Select Views of India describes it as "a grand seminary of Musalman learning, adorned by a mosque which rises high above all the surrounding buildings".
The entrance to the mosque is by fourteen flight of stairs from the east, Nawab Murshid Quli Khan has been buried under these stairs. It has been done so as per the Nawab's wish who was repentant for the misdeeds committed by him and ordered this out of humility. He wanted to be buried in such a place where he could be trodden and could get the foot prints and the touch of the feet of the noble men who climb those stairs and enter the mosque. So since the year 1725 when he died his mortal remain buried under the stairs. In the mosque there is a slab embedded at the top where it is written in Arabic: "Muhammad, the Arabian, the glory of both worlds. Dust be on the head of him who is not the dust of his portal".
This mosque is rectangular in plan. The dimensions are: 45.5m X 7.32m. It has been divided into five bays, each with an arched entrance and the central one is the most prominent one as it has a slender turret. The mosque has five domes. Some of them have been destroyed others have survived the great earthquake of 1897, which almost destroyed most of the building. The total area is 19.5 acres and can accommodate 2000 Namaz readers, that is the reason one can find 2000 squared type mats depicted on the floor, each of them used by a single Namaz reader.

The cells in the mosque are two storied and are 20 feet square. each have 6 arched doorways. 15 steps edged with stones lead up to the gate with 5 arches on either sides and a stone paved pathway which leads to the central door of the mosque. The open spaces between these cells and the mosque are 13 feet wide on either sides and 42 feet wide at the back of the mosque. the terrace in front of the mosque is 166 feet by 110 feet.

Gallery

See also
 Nawabs of Bengal and Murshidabad

References

External links

 
 Nawab Nazim Murshid Quli Khan
 Murshidabad
 
 

Islamic rule in the Indian subcontinent
Mosques in Murshidabad
Tourist attractions in Murshidabad
1724 establishments in India
Religious buildings and structures completed in 1724
Monuments of National Importance in West Bengal